12! is an album by saxophonist Sonny Stitt recorded in 1972 and released on the Muse label.

Reception
AllMusic reviewed the album stating "this album is also one of the saxophonist's most rewarding recordings".

Track listing 
All compositions by Sonny Stitt except as indicated
 "12!" – 5:03  
 "I Got It Bad (and That Ain't Good)" (Duke Ellington, Paul Francis Webster) – 4:17  
 "I Never Knew"  (Gus Kahn, Ted Fio Rito) – 6:42  
 "Our Delight" (Tadd Dameron) – 5:31  
 "The Night Has a Thousand Eyes" (Buddy Bernier, Jerry Brainin) – 4:57  
 "Blues at the Tempo" – 6:55  
 "Every Tub" (Count Basie, Eddie Durham) – 7:12

Personnel 
Sonny Stitt – alto saxophone, tenor saxophone
Barry Harris – piano
Sam Jones – bass 
Louis Hayes – drums

References 

1973 albums
Muse Records albums
Sonny Stitt albums
Albums produced by Don Schlitten